The anti-fiscal riot is a form of popular protest very common during the Ancien Régime, the bourgeois revolutions, and the 19th century, characterized by the use of direct collective action to prevent the collection of taxes.

Characteristics 

Its form and contents have varied geographically depending on the type of tax levying that the rioters were resisting against. The most common were defensive riots against tax innovations, whether they were from the absolutist state or from the new centralized states of the Napoleonic system in the 19th century. The popular mind frequently identified innovation with illegitimacy, and opponents of the regime could easily allege that the idea behind the innovations was an intent to increase the tax burden.

However, there have also been tax rebellions in which the population took advantage of a revolutionary situation to attack offensively and en masse, for example, the manorial records in which feudal tax obligations were recorded, actions which were very frequent during the reign of terror in the French Revolution. Sometimes, rebellions with anti-tax components, such as the Boston Tea Party, provoked or emerged from more general revolutionary processes.

In Spain 

In Spain, the most typical tax rebellion has been a consumer rebellion, that is, resistance against direct taxes in the marketplace as introduced by the fiscal reform of Alejandro Mon in 1845. The abolition of this tax formed part of the progressive platform between 1845 and 1868, responding to the revolts that made clear that it was not popular. In the wave of agitation in the 1854 revolution there were many consumer revolts and a new progressive government abolished the tax. In 1855 they were reintroduced, and in the commotion of the summer of 1856, although the riots of subsistence came first, there were also consumer riots.

In Portugal 

In Portugal on the other hand, the most typical tax revolt consisted of a popular rural rebellion, raised by the ringing of bells, in which the villagers expelled land registry officials when they were assessing properties, or assaulted and destroyed the public building in which the tax liabilities were registered. There were waves of revolts of this sort in 1847, 1862, and 1867, in a stubborn resistance that led the Portuguese government to abandon the development of the land registry.

Footnotes

Tax noncompliance
Tax avoidance